Nightfall is a 2004 studio album by American jazz bassist Charlie Haden and British jazz pianist John Taylor. The record was released via Naim label on 1 March 2004.

Reception 

John Kelman of All About Jazz wrote "Taylor's touch is deft as always. Haden's sound is characteristically visceral, resonating deep in the body. Spartan yet strangely elegant, one can almost feel him choose the absolutely right note for the moment. On this introspective programme, Haden and Taylor create moments of unadulterated beauty. The almost painful poignancy of "Touch Her Soft Lips" is a benchmark for the rest of the recording, as is the melancholy "My Love and I." Impeccably recorded, live with no editing, Nightfall puts two players with different approaches together; the result is both hauntingly beautiful and a lesson in simplicity."

Ian Latham of BBC stated "Nightfall is an album of deeply introspective ballads. The partnership of these two experimental but extraordinarily melodic and expressive players is ideal. One senses that this is music for musicians... It is a real pleasure to listen to the quiet power of these master musicians who treat jazz as high art. Let's hope that this transatlantic collaboration is developed further."

Track listing

Personnel
Band
Charlie Haden – bass, producer
John Taylor  – piano

Production
Evan Collins Conway – engineer 
Ken Christianson – engineer, producer, photographer
Anna Tooth – photographer 
 Ruth Cameron – assistant producer
Alan Eder – technician

References

External links

2004 albums
Charlie Haden albums
John Taylor (jazz) albums